Jazz Raga is an album by Hungarian guitarist Gábor Szabó featuring performances recorded in 1966 for the Impulse! label.

Reception
The Allmusic review by Thom Jurek awarded the album 4 stars stating "The album received mixed reviews at the time but developed a lasting cult following. Jazz Raga is a classic for its barrier-breaking invention and startling creativity".

Track listing
All compositions by Gábor Szabó except as noted
 "Walking on Nails" - 2:48
 "Mizrab" - 3:32
 "Search for Nirvana" - 2:08
 "Krishna" - 3:13
 "Raga Doll" (Gary McFarland) - 3:44
 "Comin' Back" - 1:57
 "Paint It Black" (Mick Jagger, Keith Richards) - 4:42
 "Sophisticated Wheels" - 3:54
 "Ravi" - 2:59
 "Caravan" (Juan Tizol) - 3:01
 "Summertime" (George Gershwin, DuBose Heyward) - 2:31
Recorded at Van Gelder Studio in Englewood Cliffs, New Jersey on August 4, 1966 (tracks 4, 6, 8, 10 & 11) and August 17, 1966 (tracks 1-3, 5, 7 & 9)

Personnel
Gábor Szabó - guitar, sitar, vocals
Bob Bushnell - guitar (tracks 1-3, 5, 7 & 9)
Johnny Gregg - bass
Bernard Purdie – drums

References

Impulse! Records albums
Gábor Szabó albums
1966 albums
Albums recorded at Van Gelder Studio
Albums produced by Bob Thiele